The 2008–09 Lebanese Premier League is the 48th season of Lebanon's football league. The league kicked off on October 11, 2008, Safa SC defeated Salam Zgharta at the opener. In that game, Mohammad Kassas scored the first goal of the season for Safa.

Al Ahed is the defending champion. Salam Zgharta and Shahab Al-Ghazieh promoted from the second division.

Prior to the start, Tripoli SC announced its withdrawal due to several problems. Lebanese Football Federation confirmed the withdrawal on October 9, the league is going to resume with 11 teams.

Due to the restructuring of Asian competitions, Lebanese teams were entered into the AFC Cup. The Arab Champions League on the other hand would not be played.

Teams
Al-Irshad and Al-Ahli Sidon were relegated to the second level of Lebanese football after ending the 2007–08 season in the bottom two places. Promoted from the second level were Salam Zgharta and Shabab Al-Ghazieh.

Stadia and Locations

Managerial changes

Final standings

Top scorers

References

Lebanese Premier League seasons
Leb
1
2008–09 Lebanese Premier League